Love and Other Troubles (original Finnish title: Hulluna Saraan) is a 2012 Finnish romantic comedy film directed by Samuli Valkama. It stars Emilie de Ravin as Sara, an American line dance teacher, who meets Ville, a 25-year-old former child star, and his father, an ex-rock star, who both fall in love with her. The film premiered on 27 January 2012 in Finland.

Cast 
 Emilie de Ravin as Sara
 Jussi Nikkilä as Ville
 Ville Virtanen as Dad
 Tiina Lymi as Leena
 Jessica Grabowsky as Minna
 Jussi Lampi as Skidi
 Jani Volanen as Eikka
 Janne Reinikainen as Juontaja

References

External links 
 

2012 romantic comedy films
2012 films
Finnish romantic comedy films
2010s English-language films
English-language Finnish films
2010s Finnish-language films
Films set in Finland
Films shot in Finland
Films shot in the United States
2012 multilingual films
Finnish multilingual films